Marcel Dettmann (born 26 October 1977) is a German DJ, producer, and record label owner. Dettmann is a resident DJ at the Berghain nightclub in Berlin. He used to work at Berlin's record store Hard Wax between 2002 and 2012.

In addition to being a producer Dettmann also tours DJing at clubs and electronic music festivals throughout Europe. He owns the label MDR (Marcel Dettmann Records).

Discography

Albums
 2010: Dettmann (Ostgut Ton)
 2013: Dettmann II (Ostgut Ton)
 2014: Fabric 77 (Fabric)
 2022: Fear of Programming  (Dekmantel Records)

Singles
 2006: MDR 01 (Marcel Dettmann Records)
 2006: Marcel Dettmann / Ben Klock - Dawning / Dead Man Watches The Clock (Ostgut Ton)
 2006: Quicksand / Getaway (Ostgut Ton)
 2006: MDR 02(3 Versions) (Marcel Dettmann Records) 	 	 
 2007: Marcel Dettmann | Ben Klock - Scenario (Ostgut Ton)
 2008: Pigon / Marcel Dettmann - Kamm / Plain (Beatstreet)
 2008: MDR 04 (Marcel Dettmann Records)
 2009: MDR 06 (Marcel Dettmann Records)
 2009: Marcel Dettmann / Tama Sumo & Prosumer - Phantasma Vol. 3 (12") (Diamonds & Pearls Music)
 2010: Dettmann Remixed (Ostgut Ton)
 2011: Deluge / Duel (50Weapons)
 2011: Translation EP (Ostgut Ton)
 2011: Kontra-Mokira-Mixes (12") (Kontra-Musik)
 2012: Landscape (Music Man Records)
 2012: Range EP (Ostgut Ton)
 2013: Marcel Dettmann / Lucy - Untitled (Bleep)
 2013: Corebox (James Ruskin Mixes) (Marcel Dettmann Records)
 2013: Linux / Ellipse (50Weapons)
 2013: Marcel Dettmann / Ben Klock - Dawning/Dawning (Revisited) (Ostgut Ton)
 2014: Planetary Assault Systems Remixes (Marcel Dettmann Records)
 2014: Marcel Dettmann / Frank Wiedemann - Masse Remixes II (Ostgut Ton)
 2014: Marcel Dettmann featuring Emika - Seduction (Ostgut Ton)

Remixes
 2007: Ellen Allien - Go (Dettmann Remix) (Bpitch Control)
 2008: Kevin Gorman - SevenAightNine (Dettmann Remix) (Mikrowave)
 2008: Len Faki - My Black Sheep (Dettmann Remix) (Figure)
 2008: Scuba - From Within (Marcel Dettmann Remix) (Hotflush)
 2008: Modeselektor - Black Block (Dettmann Remix) (Bpitch Control)
 2010: Junior Boys - Work (Dettmann Remix) (Ostgut Ton)
 2010: Glimpse - Enjoyable Employable (Crosstown Rebels)
 2011: Fever Ray - Seven (Dettmann Remix) (Rabid Records)
 2013: Moderat - Bad Kingdom (Dettmann Remix) (50 Weapons)
 2014: Darksky - Rainkist (Dettmann Remix) (Monkey Town Records)

References

German DJs
Club DJs
1977 births
Place of birth missing (living people)
Living people
Electronic dance music DJs